Košarkaški klub Mladost, commonly referred to as KK Mladost Mrkonjić Grad or simply Mladost Mrkonjić Grad, is a men's professional basketball club based in Mrkonjić Grad, Republika Srpska, Bosnia and Herzegovina. Mladost competes in the Basketball Championship of Bosnia and Herzegovina.

History 
Mladost will participate at the first qualifying round to enter the inaugural season of the Adriatic League Second Division.

Players

Current roster

Notable players 
   Đorđe Aleksić
  Obrad Tomić
  Draško Knežević
  Filip Adamović 
  Milan Kezić
  Arsenije Vučković
  Aleksandar Radukić
   Dragan Đuranović
  Stefan Mijović
  Gojko Sudžum
  Miloš Komatina
  Igor Bijelić 
   Ranko Velimirović 
   Milijan Bocka
  Nikola Malešević
   Ninoslav Milošević
  Marko Jeremić
  Bogdan Riznić
  Sreten Knežević
  Vojin Svilar
  Koča Jovović
  Stefan Mitrović
  Đoko Šalić
  Dejan Ćup
  Pavel Lobarev
Source: Eurobasket.com

Seasons 
 2011–12 KK Mladost Mrkonjić Grad season
 2012–13 KK Mladost Mrkonjić Grad season

References

External links 
 Profile at basketball.realgm.com
 Profile at eurobasket.com

Basketball teams in Bosnia and Herzegovina
Basketball teams in Yugoslavia
Basketball teams established in 1970